Malabar District, also known as Malayalam District, was an administrative district on the southwestern Malabar Coast of Bombay Presidency (1792-1800) and Madras Presidency (1800-1947) in British India, and independent India's Madras State (1947-1956). It was the most populous and the third-largest district in the erstwhile Madras State. The British district included the present-day districts of Kannur, Kozhikode, Wayanad, Malappuram, Palakkad (excluding Chittur taluk), Chavakad Taluk and parts of Kodungallur Taluk of Thrissur district (former part of Ponnani Taluk), and Fort Kochi area of Ernakulam district in the northern and central parts of present Kerala state, the Lakshadweep Islands, and a major portion of the Nilgiris district in Tamil Nadu. The detached settlements of Tangasseri and Anchuthengu, which were British colonies within the kingdom of Travancore in southern Kerala, also formed part of Malabar District until 1927. Malayalam was the administrative as well as the most spoken lingua franca of Malabar District during British Rule. Jeseri, a distinct dialect of Malayalam, was spoken in the Laccadive Islands. Malabar District merged with the erstwhile state of Travancore-Cochin (1950-1956) to form Kerala according to the States Reorganisation Act, 1956. On the same day, the present Kasaragod district of South Canara District was also attached to Malabar, and the Laccadive & Minicoy Islands of Malabar were reorganised to form a new Union Territory. Malabar was trifurcated to form the districts of Kannur, Kozhikode, and Palakkad, on 1 January 1957.

The city of Kozhikode was the capital of Malabar. Malabar was divided into North Malabar and South Malabar in 1793 for administrative convenience, with their regional headquarters at Thalassery and Cherpulassery (Later changed to Ottapalam) respectively. During the British rule, Malabar's chief importance lay in its production of Malabar pepper, coconut, and tiles. In the old administrative records of the Madras Presidency, it is recorded that the most remarkable plantation owned by Government in the erstwhile Madras Presidency was the Teak plantation at Nilambur planted in 1844. The District of Malabar and the ports at Beypore and Fort Kochi had some sort of importance in the erstwhile Madras Presidency as it was one of the two districts of the Presidency that lies on the Western Malabar Coast, thus accessing the marine route through Arabian Sea. The first railway line of Kerala from Tirur to Beypore in 1861 was laid for it. The work Malabar Manual (1887) authored by William Logan in two volumes explains the characteristics of Malabar.

The district lay between the Arabian Sea on the west, South Canara District on the north, the Western Ghats (the princely states of Coorg and Mysore, and Nilgiris and Coimbatore districts) to the east, and the princely state of Cochin to the south. The name Mala-bar means the "hillside slopes".

All the major pre-independence political parties of Kerala such as the Indian National Congress, Communist Party of India (CPI), and Muslim League started their functioning in Kerala at Malabar District as a part of the freedom struggle. Kerala Pradesh Congress Committee was formed in 1921 at Ottapalam, on the bank of river Bharathappuzha. In July 1937, a clandestine meeting of the Congress Socialist Party, which was the political party formed by socialists of Congress, was held at Calicut. The CPI in Kerala was formed on 31 December 1939 with the Pinarayi Conference, held near Thalassery. It was the erstwhile leaders of Congress Socialist Party, such as E. M. S. Namboodiripad and A. K. Gopalan, who formed the CPI branch in Kerala. The Muslim League was also formed in the 1930s, on a meeting held at Thalassery.

Etymology
Until the arrival of British, the term Malabar was used in foreign trade circles as a general name for Kerala. Earlier, the term Malabar had also been used to denote Tulu Nadu and Kanyakumari which lie contiguous to Kerala in the southwestern coast of India, in addition to the modern state of Kerala. The people of Malabar were known as Malabars. Still the term Malabar is often used to denote the entire southwestern coast of India. From the time of Cosmas Indicopleustes (6th century CE) itself, the Arab sailors used to call Kerala as Male. The first element of the name, however, is attested already in the Topography written by Cosmas Indicopleustes. This mentions a pepper emporium called Male, which clearly gave its name to Malabar ('the country of Male'). The name Male is thought to come from the Malayalam word Mala ('hill'). Al-Biruni (AD 973 - 1048) must have been the first writer to call this state Malabar.  Authors such as Ibn Khordadbeh and Al-Baladhuri mention Malabar ports in their works. The Arab writers had called this place Malibar, Manibar, Mulibar, and Munibar. Malabar is reminiscent of the word Malanad which means the land of hills. According to William Logan, the word Malabar comes from a combination of the Malayalam word Mala (hill) and the Persian/Arabic word Barr (country/continent).

History

South Malabar

Ancient era
The ancient maritime port of Tyndis, which was then a centre of trade with Ancient Rome, is roughly identified with Ponnani, Tanur, and Kadalundi-Vallikkunnu. Tyndis was a major center of trade, next only to Muziris, between the Cheras and the Roman Empire. The River Bharathappuzha (River Ponnani) had importance since Sangam period (1st-4th century CE), due to the presence of Palakkad Gap which connected the Malabar coast with Coromandel coast through inland.

Pliny the Elder (1st century CE) states that the port of Tyndis was located at the northwestern border of Keprobotos (Chera dynasty). The North Malabar region, which lies north of the port at Tyndis, was ruled by the kingdom of Ezhimala during Sangam period. According to the Periplus of the Erythraean Sea, a region known as Limyrike began at Naura and Tyndis. However the Ptolemy mentions only Tyndis as the Limyrikes starting point. The region probably ended at Kanyakumari; it thus roughly corresponds to the present-day Malabar Coast. The value of Rome's annual trade with the region was estimated at around 50,000,000 sesterces. Pliny the Elder mentioned that Limyrike was prone by pirates. The Cosmas Indicopleustes mentioned that the Limyrike was a source of peppers.Das, Santosh Kumar (2006). The Economic History of Ancient India. Genesis Publishing Pvt Ltd. p. 301.

Early Middle Ages
Three inscriptions those date back to 932 CE, those were found from Triprangode (near Tirunavaya), Kottakkal, and Chaliyar, mention the name of Goda Ravi of Chera dynasty. The Triprangode inscription states about the agreement of Thavanur. Several inscriptions written in Old Malayalam those date back to the 10th century CE, have found from Sukapuram near Edappal, which was one of the 64 old Nambudiri villages of Kerala. Descriptions about the rulers of Eranad and Valluvanad regions can be seen in the Jewish copper plates of Bhaskara Ravi Varman (around 1000 CE) and Viraraghava copper plates  of Veera Raghava Chakravarthy (around 1225 CE). Eranad was ruled by a Samanthan Nair clan known as Eradis, similar to the Vellodis of neighbouring Valluvanad and Nedungadis of Nedunganad. The rulers of Valluvanad were known by the title Eralppad/Eradi. It was the ruler of Eranad who later became the Zamorin of Calicut by annexing the port town of Calicut from Polanad, which was vassal to Kolathunadu. The ruler of Kingdom of Cochin also traces back to Ponnani in South Malabar. South Malabar was also the seat of the kingdoms of Parappanad, Vettathunadu, Valluvanadu, Nedungadis, and Palakkad. Parappanad royal family is a cousin dynasty of the Travancore royal family. The Azhvanchery Thamprakkal were the feudal lords of Athavanad. Tirunavaya, the seat of Mamankam festival, lies on the bank of the river Bharathappuzha.

Rise of Kozhikode
In the 14th century, Kozhikode conquered larger parts of central Kerala after the seize of Tirunavaya region from Valluvanad, which were under the control of the king of Perumbadappu Swaroopam (Cochin). The ruler of Perumpadappu was forced to shift his capital (c. CE 1405) further south from Kodungallur to Kochi. In the 15th century, the status of Cochin was reduced to a vassal state of Kozhikode, thus leading to the emergence of Kozhikode as the most powerful kingdom in medieval Malabar Coast.

During the 15th century Kalaripayattu was important in the history of Malabar, where some warriors lived, most notably puthooram veettil Aromal Chekavar and his sister Unniyarcha, chieftains of martial arts.
Kozhikode was the largest city in the Indian state of Kerala under the rule of Zamorin of Calicut, an independent kingdom based at Kozhikode. It remained so until the 18th century CE. The port at Kozhikode was the gateway to South Indian coast for the Arabs, the Portuguese, the Dutch, and finally the British. The Kunjali Marakkars, who were the naval chief of the Zamorin of Kozhikode, are credited with organizing the first naval defense of the Indian coast. Under British Raj, Kozhikode became the headquarters of Malabar District, one of the two districts in the western coast of erstwhile Madras Presidency. The port at Kozhikode held the superior economic and political position in medieval Kerala coast, while Kannur, Kollam, and Kochi, were commercially important secondary ports, where the traders from various parts of the world would gather. The Portuguese arrived at Kappad Kozhikode in 1498 during the Age of Discovery, thus opening a direct sea route from Europe to South Asia. Kallingal Madathil Rarichan Moopan and Pullambil Moopan and Vamala Moopan families were very prominent among those who said that two centuries ago, some Jenmis in Kozhikode were engaged in sea trade and shipping.

At the peak of their reign, the Zamorins of Kozhikode ruled over a region from Kollam (Quilon) in the south to Panthalayini Kollam (Koyilandy) in the north. They were the most powerful rulers on Malabar Coast and Kozhikode was the largest city of Kerala until the Portuguese era. The Zamorin of Calicut, who was originally the ruler of Eranad based at Nediyiruppu, developed the port at Kozhikode and changed his headquarters to there for maritime trade. Ibn Battuta (1342–1347), who visited the city of Kozhikode six times, gives the earliest glimpses of life in the city. He describes Kozhikode as "one of the great ports of the district of Malabar" where "merchants of all parts of the world are found". The king of this place, he says, "shaves his chin just as the Haidari Fakeers of Rome do... The greater part of the Muslim merchants of this place are so wealthy that one of them can purchase the whole freightage of such vessels put here and fit-out others like them". Ma Huan (1403 AD), the Chinese sailor part of the Imperial Chinese fleet under Cheng Ho (Zheng He) states the city as a great emporium of trade frequented by merchants from around the world. He makes note of the 20 or 30 mosques built to cater to the religious needs of the Muslims, the unique system of calculation by the merchants using their fingers and toes (followed to this day), and the matrilineal system of succession. Abdur Razzak (1442–43), Niccolò de' Conti (1445), Afanasy Nikitin (1468–74), Ludovico di Varthema (1503–1508), and Duarte Barbosa witnessed the city as one of the major trading centres in the Indian subcontinent where traders from different parts of the world could be seen.Gangadharan. M., The Land of Malabar: The Book of Barbosa (2000), Vol II, M.G. University, Kottayam.

The Kingdom of Cochin used to adopt members from Kingdom of Tanur in the medieval period. Being home to the prominent figures like Thunchaththu Ezhuthachan, Poonthanam Nambudiri, Melpathur Narayana Bhattathiri, Kunchan Nambiar, and Zainuddin Makhdoom II, South Malabar was the cultural capital of medieval Kerala. The Kerala school of astronomy and mathematics flourished between the 14th and 16th centuries. In attempting to solve astronomical problems, the Kerala school independently created a number of important mathematics concepts, including series expansion for trigonometric functions. The Kerala School of Astronomy and Mathematics was based at Vettathunadu (Tirur region) of South Malabar.

Kozhikode, Tanur, and  Ponnani were the three major port cities in South Malabar region, while the minor trading ports included Beypore, Parappanangadi, and Chaliyam. The coastal Kingdom of Tanur, the Kingdom of Valluvanad in inland, and Palakkad in the hilly region formed other major kingdoms in South Malabar region in the medieval period. Marthanda Varma, the founder of Travancore, belongs to Parappanad royal family. In 1664, the municipality of Fort Kochi was established by Dutch Malabar, making it the first municipality in Indian subcontinent, which got dissolved when the Dutch authority got weaker in the 18th century.

North Malabar

Ancient era
North Malabar was the seat of powerful kingdom based at Ezhimala in the Sangam period (1st-5th century CE). The ancient port of Naura, which is mentioned in the Periplus of the Erythraean Sea as a port somewhere north of Muziris is identified with Kannur. The kingdom of Ezhimala had jurisdiction over two Nadus - The coastal Poozhinadu and the hilly eastern Karkanadu. According to the works of Sangam literature, Poozhinadu consisted much of the coastal belt between Mangalore and Kozhikode. Karkanadu consisted of Wayanad-Gudalur hilly region with parts of Kodagu (Coorg). It is said that Nannan, the most renowned ruler of Ezhimala dynasty, took refuge at Wayanad hills in the 5th century CE when he was lost to Cheras, just before his execution in a battle, according to the Sangam works.

Early Middle Ages
Ezhimala kingdom was succeeded by Mushika dynasty in the early medieval period, most possibly due to the migration of Tuluva Brahmins from Tulu Nadu. The Indian anthropologist Ayinapalli Aiyappan states that a powerful and warlike clan of the Bunt community of Tulu Nadu was called Kola Bari and the Kolathiri Raja of Kolathunadu was a descendant of this clan. The Kolathunadu (Kannur) Kingdom at the peak of its power, reportedly extended from Netravati River (Mangalore) in the north to Korapuzha (Kozhikode) in the south with Arabian Sea on the west and Kodagu hills on the eastern boundary, also including the isolated islands of Lakshadweep in the Arabian Sea.

An Old Malayalam inscription (Ramanthali inscriptions), dated to 1075 CE, mentioning king Kunda Alupa, the ruler of Alupa dynasty of Mangalore, can be found at Ezhimala (the former headquarters of Mushika dynasty) near Cannanore, Kerala. The Arabic inscription on a copper slab within the Madayi Mosque in Kannur records its foundation year as 1124 CE. In his book on travels (Il Milione), Marco Polo recounts his visit to the area in the mid 1290s. Other visitors included Faxian, the Buddhist pilgrim and Ibn Batuta, writer and historian of Tangiers.

Late Middle Ages

Until the 16th century CE, the Kasargod town was known by the name Kanhirakode (may be by the meaning, 'The land of Kanhira Trees') in Malayalam. The Kumbla dynasty, who swayed over the land of southern Tulu Nadu wedged between Chandragiri River and Netravati River (including present-day Taluks of Manjeshwar and Kasaragod) from Maipady Palace at Kumbla, had also been vassals to the Kolathunadu, before the Carnatic conquests of Vijayanagara Empire. The Kumbla dynasty had a mixed lineage of Malayali Nairs and Tuluva Brahmins. They also claimed their origin from Cheraman Perumals of Kerala. Francis Buchanan-Hamilton states that the customs of Kumbla dynasty were similar to those of the contemporary Malayali kings, though Kumbla was considered as the southernmost region of Tulu Nadu. Just like other contemporary kings of Kerala in the medieval period, The powerful Kolathu Raja also came under the influence of Zamorin later. The  Kolathunadu in the late medieval period emerged into independent 10 principalities i.e., Kadathanadu (Vadakara), Randathara or Poyanad (Dharmadom), Kottayam (Thalassery), Nileshwaram, Iruvazhinadu (Panoor, Kurumbranad etc.,   under separate royal chieftains due to the outcome of internal dissensions. The Nileshwaram dynasty on the northernmost part of Kolathiri dominion, were relatives to both Kolathunadu as well as the Zamorin of Calicut, in the early medieval period.

Kannur was an important trading centre in the 12th century, with active business connections with Persia and Arabia. It served as the British military headquarters on India's west coast until 1887. Kannur Cantonment is the only cantonment board in Kerala. Kannur was the capital city of Kolathunadu, one of the four powerful kingdoms who ruled Kerala during the medieval period. Arakkal Kingdom and Chirakkal kingdom were two vassal kingdoms based in the city of Kannur. The port at Kozhikode held the superior economic and political position in medieval Kerala coast, while Kannur, Kollam, and Kochi, were commercially important secondary ports, where the traders from various parts of the world would gather. St. Angelo Fort was built in 1505 by Dom Francisco de Almeida, the first Portuguese Viceroy of India. The Dutch captured the fort from the Portuguese in 1663. They modernized the fort and built the bastions Hollandia, Zeelandia, and Frieslandia that are the major features of the present structure. The original Portuguese fort was pulled down later. A painting of this fort and the fishing ferry behind it can be seen in the Rijksmuseum Amsterdam. The Dutch sold the fort to the king Ali Raja of Arakkal in 1772. The British conquered it in 1790 and used it as one of their major military stations on the Malabar Coast. During the 17th century, Kannur was the capital city of the only Muslim Sultanate in the Malabar region -  Arakkal. The Ali Rajas of Arakkal kingdom, near Kannur, who were the vassals of the Kolathiri, ruled over the Lakshadweep islands.

In 1761, the British captured Mahé, and the settlement was handed over to the ruler of Kadathanadu. The British restored Mahé to the French as a part of the 1763 Treaty of Paris. In 1779, the Anglo-French war broke out, resulting in the French loss of Mahé. In 1783, the British agreed to restore to the French their settlements in India, and Mahé was handed over to the French in 1785.

In conjunction with her sister city, Thalassery, it was the third-largest city on the western coast of British India in the 18th century after Bombay and Karachi. Vatakara and Koyilandy were two major coastal towns in North Malabar region besides Kannur and Thalassery.

Portuguese influences

The maritime spice trade monopoly in the Indian Ocean stayed with the Arabs during the High and Late Middle Ages. However, the dominance of Middle East traders was challenged in the European Age of Discovery. After Vasco Da Gama's arrival in Kappad Kozhikode in 1498, the Portuguese began to dominate eastern shipping, and the spice-trade in particular. The Zamorin of Kozhikode permitted the new visitors to trade with his subjects such that Portuguese trade in Kozhikode prospered with the establishment of a factory and a fort. However, Portuguese attacks on Arab properties in his jurisdiction provoked the Zamorin and led to conflicts between them.

The ruler of the Kingdom of Tanur, who was a vassal to the Zamorin of Calicut, sided with the Portuguese, against his overlord at Kozhikode. As a result, the Kingdom of Tanur (Vettathunadu) became one of the earliest Portuguese Colonies in India. The ruler of Tanur also sided with Cochin. Many of the members of the royal family of Cochin in 16th and 17th members were selected from Vettom. However, the Tanur forces under the king fought for the Zamorin of Calicut in the Battle of Cochin (1504).  However, the allegiance of the Mappila merchants in Tanur region still stayed under the Zamorin of Calicut.

The Portuguese took advantage of the rivalry between the Zamorin and the King of Kochi allied with Kochi. When Francisco de Almeida was appointed as Viceroy of Portuguese India in 1505, his headquarters was established at Fort Kochi (Fort Emmanuel) rather than in Kozhikode. During his reign, the Portuguese managed to dominate relations with Kochi and established a few fortresses on the Malabar Coast. Fort St Angelo or St. Angelo Fort was built at Kannur in 1505 and Fort St Thomas was built at Kollam(Quilon) in 1518 by the Portuguese. However, the Portuguese suffered setbacks from attacks by Zamorin forces in Malabar region; especially from naval attacks under the leadership of Kozhikode admirals known as Kunjali Marakkars, which compelled them to seek a treaty. The Kunjali Marakkars are credited with organizing the first naval defense of the Indian coast. An insurrection at the Port of Quilon between the Arabs and the Portuguese led to the end of the Portuguese era in Quilon. In 1571, the Portuguese were defeated by the Zamorin forces in the battle at Chaliyam Fort. The Portuguese were ousted by the Dutch East India Company, who during the conflicts between the Kozhikode and the Kochi, gained control of the trade.

Under Mysore Sultans

In 1757, to check the invasion of the Zamorin of Calicut, the Palakkad Raja sought the help of Hyder Ali of Mysore. In 1766, Haider Ali of Mysore defeated the Samoothiri of Kozhikode – an East India Company ally at the time – and absorbed Kozhikode to his state.World States Men: Indian Princes Princely states of India After the Third Mysore War (1790–1792), Malabar was placed under the control of the company. Eventually, the status of the Samoothiri was reduced to that of a pensioner of the company (1806).V. V., Haridas. "King court and culture in medieval Kerala – The Zamorins of Calicut (AD 1200 to AD 1767)".  Unpublished PhD Thesis. Mangalore University When Wayanad was under Hyder Ali's rule, the ghat road from Vythiri to Thamarassery was constructed. Then the British rulers developed this route to Carter road. His son and successor, Tipu Sultan, launched campaigns against the expanding British East India Company, resulting in two of the four Anglo-Mysore Wars.

Colonial period
Tipu ultimately ceded the Malabar district and South Kanara to the company in the 1790s; both were initially annexed to the Bombay Presidency of British India. After the Anglo-Mysore wars, the parts of Malabar Coast, those became British colonies, were organized into a district of British India. Later the region was transferred into the Madras Presidency in 1800. The administrative headquarters were at Calicut (Kozhikode). Local affairs were managed by the District Board at Calicut along with Taluk Boards located at Malappuram, Thalassery, Palakkad and Mananthavady. Initially the British had to suffer local resistance against their rule under the leadership of Kerala Varma Pazhassi Raja, who had popular support in Thalassery-Wayanad region. During the 19th century, British established their army stations at Kannur, Malappuram, and Calicut. Malappuram which was one of the European military stations in Madras presidency since 1852, also became the special police force headquarters of Malabar District, with the establishment of the Malabar Special Police in 1885. British in Malabar also converted Thiyyar army, called as Thiyya pattalam into a special regiment centered at Thalassery called as The Thiyyar Regiment in 1904. The oldest railway lines of Kerala lie in Malabar District which was laid in the late 19th century for the transportation of good and services; the line laid from Tirur to Beypore in 1861 being the first among them.

According to William Logan, the Taluks of Malabar could be subdivided on the basis of the feudal lords who ruled them before as given below:

Chirakkal Taluk
The Amsoms included in Chirakkal Taluk was classified into two divisions of Kolathunadu and Randathara (also called Poyanadu). There were 44 Amsoms in the Taluk.

1. KolathunaduKolathunadu was the land where Kolattiri Rajas (Chirakkal family) were historically considered as the main authority. It was ruled by Kolattiri Raja, Mannanars, Arakkal Kingdom, and Kingdom of Mysore in various periods. It consisted of the following 36 Amsoms:

 Payyannur
 Vellur
 Karivellur
 Korom
 Eramam
 Kuttur (Payyanur)
 Kuttiyeri
 Chuzhali
 Kanhileri
 Kalliad
 Malapattam
 Koyyam
 Kurumathur
 Taliparamba
 Pattuvam
 Ezhome
 Cheruthazham
 Kunhimangalam
 Madayi
 Matool
 Cherukunnu
 Kannapuram
 Irinave
 Pappinisseri
 Kalliasseri
 Morazha
 Kayaralam
 Kuttiattoor
 Maniyoor
 Munderi
 Cheleri
 Kannadiparamba
 Chirakkal
 Azhikode
 Puzhathi
 Elayavoor

2. RandatharaRandathara was also called Poyanadu due to the belief that it was the place from where the Cheraman Perumal took his final departure on the journey to Mecca. It was originally a part of Kolathunadu, but was treated as a different Nadu. It consisted of the following 7 Amsoms:

 Edakkad
 Chembilode
 Iriveri
 Makreri
 Anjarakkandy
 Mavilayi
 Muzhappilangad

Kottayam Taluk
The Amsoms included in Kottayam Taluk was classified into four divisions- The English Settlement at Tellicherry and Dharmapattanam Islands, Iruvazhinadu, Kurangott Nayar Nadu, and Kottayam. There were 28 Amsoms in the Taluk.

1. The English Settlement at Tellicherry and Dharmapattanam IslandsIt was a part of the ancient Kolathunadu. Later it became a part of the Arakkal kingdom and Kingdom of Mysore. The island of Dharmapattanam was claimed by all of the Kolattu Rajas, Kottayam Rajas, and  Arakkal Bibi. The English had settled here and started a factory here. It consisted of the following 4 Amsoms:

 Dharmadam
 Thalassery
 Mailanjanmam
 Thiruvangad

2. IruvazhinaduIt was also under the Kolathunadu earlier. When the English factory was established at Thalassery, Iruvazhinadu was held by six families of Nambiars - Kunnummal, Chandroth, Kizhakkedath, Kampurath, Narangozhi, and Kariyad Nambiars. Kurangott Nayars possession also probably formed part of the original territory of Iruvazhinadu.  It consisted of the following 6 Amsoms:

 Panoor
 Puthur
 Thrippangottur
 Panniyannur
 Peringalam
 Kariyad

3. Kurangott Nayar Nadu

It laid between the English settlement at Thalassery and the French settlement at Mahe. It consisted of the following two Amsoms.

 Olavilam
 Kallayi

4. Kottayam

It was also earlier a part of Kolathunadu. The Kottayam Rajas (also known as Puranattu Rajas in the meaning of foreign Kshatriya caste) received their territory from the Kolattu Rajas. Pazhassi Raja was a Kottayam Raja. It consisted of the following 16 Amsoms.

 Koodali
 Pattannur
 Chavassery
 Veliyambra
 Muzhakkunnu
 Gannavam
 Manathana
 Kannavam
 Sivapuram
 Pazhassi
 Kandamkunnu
 Paduvilayi
 Pinarayi
 Nettur
 Kadirur
 Kottayam

Wynad Taluk

The Amsoms included in Wynad Taluk was classified into three divisions- North Wynad, South Wynad, and Southeast Wynad. There were 16 Amsoms in the Taluk. Wynad was a separate Revenue Division within Malabar District until 1924.

Wynad was ruled by various kingdoms including Kutumbiyas, Kadambas, Western Chalukyas, Hoysalas, Vijayanagaras, and the Kingdom of Mysore, in various periods. Wynad was home to many tribes. Wynad has relations with the Kingdom of Kottayam and Kurumbranad. Some parts were ruled by the Kottayam dynasty.

1. North Wynad

It consisted of the following 7 Amsoms:

 Periya
 Edavaka
 Thondernad
 Porunnanore
 Nalloornad
 Ellurnad
 Kuppathod

2. South Wynad

It consisted of the following 6 Amsoms:

 Poothadi
 Kurumbala
 Vythiri
 Edanatassakur
 Muppanad
 Sultan Bathery

3. Southeast Wynad

It was the regions included in the Gudalur and Pandalur Taluks of present Nilgiris district. Southeast Wynad was a part of Malabar District until 31 March 1877, when it was transferred to the neighbouring Nilgiris district due to the heavy population of Malabar and the small area of Nilgiris. It consisted of the following 3 Amsoms.

 Munnanad
 Nambalakode
 Cherankode

Kurumbranad Taluk

The Amsoms included in Kurumbranad Taluk was classified into five divisions- Kadathanad, Payyormala, Payanad, Kurumbranad, and Thamarassery (Some Amsoms of Kurumbranad and Thamarassery were included in the Kozhikode Taluk). There were 57 Amsoms in the Taluk.

1. Kadathanad

It was also part of the Kolathunadu earlier. It formed a major portion of the Thekkalankur (Southern Regent), or the second headquarters of the Kolattiri Rajas. When the English company settled at Thalassery, Kadathanad was under the ancestors of the Kadathanad Rajas, who was then called Bavnores of Badagara. It consisted of the following 31 Amsoms:

 Azhiyur
 Muttungal
 Eramala
 Karthikappalli
 Purameri
 Edacheri
 Iringannur
 Thuneri
 Vellur
 Parakkadavu
 Chekkiad
 Valayam
 Velliyode
 Kunnummal
 Kavilumpara
 Kuttiadi
 Velom
 Cherapuram
 Kottappally
 Ayancheri
 Katameri
 Kuttipuram
 Kummangod
 Ponmeri
 Arakkilad
 Vatakara
 Memunda
 Palayad
 Puduppanam
 Maniyur
 Thiruvallur

2. Payyormala

It was under the control of the Nairs of Payyormala (Paleri, Avinyat, and Kutali Nairs). They were independent chieftains with some theoretical dependence on both the Kurumbranad and the Zamorin of Calicut.  It consisted of the following 7 Amsoms:

 Palery
 Cheruvannur
 Meppayur
 Perambra
 Karayad
 Iringath

3. Payanadu

It was dependent on the Zamorin of Calicut. It consisted of the following 9 Amsoms:

 Keezhariyur
 Moodadi
 Pallikkara
 Meladi
 Viyyur
 Arikkulam
 Melur
 Chemancheri
 Thiruvangoor

4. Kurumbranad

It was subjected to the Kurumbranad family, which was connected with the Kingdom of Kottayam. It consisted of the following 9 Amsoms in Kurumbranad and Kozhikode Taluks:

 Kottur
 Trikkuttisseri
 Naduvannur
 Kavumthara
 Iyyad
 Panangad
 Nediyanad
 Kizhakkoth
 Madavoor

5. Thamarassery

It was also subjected to the Kottayam Rajas. It consisted of the following 9 Amsoms in Kurumbranad and Kozhikode Taluks:

 Ulliyeri
 Kokkallur
 Edakkara
 Kunnathara
 Annassery
 Naduvallur
 Nanmanda
 Nediyanad
 Koodathayi

Kozhikode Taluk
The Amsoms included in Kozhikode Taluk was classified into three divisions- Polanad, Beypore (Northern Parappanad), and Puzhavayi. There were 41 Amsoms in the Taluk. (As stated earlier, a part of Kurumbranad and Thamarasseri historical divisions of Kurumbranad Taluk was also included in the Kozhikode Taluk.)

1. Polanad

Polanad was ruled by the Porlathiri Rajas before the conquest of Kozhikode by the Zamorin of Calicut. After the conquest, the Zamorins shifted their headquarters from Nediyiruppu in Eranad to Kozhikode. It became the capital of the Zamorins. It consisted of the following 22 Amsoms:

 Elathur
 Thalakkulathur
 Makkada
 Chathamangalam
 Kunnamangalam
 Thamarassery
 Kuruvattur
 Padinyattumuri
 Karannur
 Edakkad
 Kacheri
 Nagaram
 Kasaba
 Valayanad
 Kottooli
 Chevayur
 Mayanad
 Kovoor
 Perumanna
 Peruvayal
 Iringallur
 Olavanna

2. Beypore (Northern Parappanad)

Parappanad kingdom was a dependent of the Zamorin of Calicut headquartered at Parappanangadi. It was divided into Northern Parappanad and Southern Parappanad. Northern Parappanad was headquartered at Beypore.  It consisted of the following 3 Amsoms:

 Beypore
 Panniyankara
 Cheruvannur

3. Puzhavayi

It was ruled by its own Nairs who had a dependence on both of the Zamorin of Calicut and the Kurumbranad. It consisted of the following 9 Amsoms:

 Kedavur
 Thiruvambady
 Puthur
 Neeleswaram
 Koduvally
 Kanniparamba
 Chuloor
 Manashery
 Pannikode

Ernad Taluk

The Amsoms included in Ernad Taluk was classified into four divisions- Parappur (Southern Parappanad), Ramanad, Cheranad, and Eranad. There were 52 Amsoms in the Taluk. (A part of Cheranad division was under Ponnani Taluk).

1. Parappur (Southern Parappanad)

Southern Parappanad was a dependent of the Zamorin of Calicut. Parappanangadi, the headquarters of Parappanad royal family, was at Southern Parappanad. It consisted of the following 7 Amsoms:

 Pazhanchannur
 Mannur
 Tenhipalam
 Neduva
 Vallikunnu
 Parappanangadi
 Nannambra

2. Ramanad

Ramanad was directly ruled by the Zamorin of Calicut.  It consisted of the following 7 Amsoms:

 Nallur
 Azhinjilam
 Cherukavu
 Karad
 Karumarakkad
 Karippur
 Chelembra

3. Cheranad

Cheranad was also directly ruled by the Zamorin of Calicut. Cheranad was scattered in Eranad and Ponnani Taluks. The headquarters of Cheranad was Tirurangadi. It consisted of the following 17 Amsoms:

 Vadakkumpuram
 Valiyakunnu
 Kattipparuthi
 Athavanad
 Ummathoor
 Irimbiliyam
 Parudur
 Olakara
 Trikkulam
 Koduvayur
 Vengara
 Kannamangalam
 Oorakam-Melmuri
 Puthur
 Kottakkal
 Indiannur
 Valakkulam

4. Eranad

Eranad was the original headquarters of the Zamorin of Calicut. It was later changed to Kozhikode with the conquest of Polanad. It also was under the direct rule of the Zamorin. It consisted of the following 26 Amsoms:

 Mappram
 Cheekkode
 Urangattiri
 Mampad
 Nilambur
 Porur
 Wandoor
 Thiruvali
 Trikkalangode
 Karakunnu
 Iruvetti
 Kavanoor
 Chengara
 Puliyakode
 Kuzhimanna
 Kolathur
 Nediyiruppu
 Keezhmuri
 Melmuri
 Arimbra
 Valluvambram
 Irumbuzhi
 Manjeri
 Payyanad
 Elankur
 Ponmala

Walluvanad Taluk

The Amsoms included in Walluvanad Taluk was classified into four divisions- Vellatiri (Walluvanad proper), Walluvanad, Nedunganad, and Kavalappara. There were 64 Amsoms in the Taluk.

1. Vellatiri (Walluvanad Proper)

Vellatiri (Walluvanad Proper) was the sole remaining territory of the Walluvanad Raja (Valluvakonathiri), who had once ruled majority of the South Malabar. A major part of Ernad Taluk was under Walluvanad before the expansion of the Ernad in 13th-14th centuries. Some of the Amsoms in this division was part of the Ernad Taluk. It consisted of the following 26 Amsoms: 

 Kodur
 Kuruva
 Mankada-Pallipuram
 Mankada
 Valambur
 Karyavattam
 Nenmini
 Melattur
 Vettattur
 Kottoppadam
 Arakurissi
 Tachampara
 Arakkuparamba
 Chethallur
 Angadipuram
 Perinthalmanna
 Puzhakkattiri
 Pang
 Kolathur
 Kuruvambalam
 Pulamantol
 Elamkulam
 Anamangad
 Paral
 Chembrassery
 Pandikkad

2. Walluvanad

The Amsoms in this division was comparatively later acquisition by the Zamorin in the territory of the Walluvanad Raja.  It consisted of the following 7 Amsoms:

 Tuvvur
 Thiruvizhamkunnu
 Thenkara
 Kumaramputhur
 Karimpuzha
 Thachchanattukara
 Aliparamba

3. Nedunganad

Nedunganad had been under the Zamorin for some time. After the disintegration of Perumals of Mahodayapuram, Nedunganad became independent. It was ruled by Nedungadis. Later it came under the Zamorin's kingdom. It consisted of the following 27 Amsoms:

 Elambulassery
 Vellinezhi
 Sreekrishnapuram
 Kadampazhipuram
 Kalladikode
 Vadakkumpuram
 Moothedath Madamba
 Thrikkadeeri
 Chalavara
 Cherpulassery
 Naduvattam-Karalmanna
 Kulukkallur
 Chundambatta
 Vilayur
 Pulasseri
 Naduvattam
 Muthuthala
 Perumudiyoor
 Nethirimangalam
 Pallippuram
 Kalladipatta
 Vallapuzha
 Kothakurssi
 Eledath Madamba
 Chunangad
 Mulanjur
 Perur

4. Kavalappara

Kavalappara had its own Nairs, who owed a sort of nominal allegiance both to the Zamorin of Calicut and the Kingdom of Cochin.  It consisted of the following 6 Amsoms:

 Mundakkottukurissi
 Panamanna
 Koonathara
 Karakkad
 Kuzhappalli
 Mundamuka

Ponnani Taluk

The Amsoms included in Ponnani Taluk was classified into three divisions- Vettathunad, Koottanad, Chavakkad, and the Island of Chetvai . There were 73 Amsoms in the Taluk.

1. Vettathunad

Vettathunad, also known as the Kingdom of Tanur, was a coastal city-state kingdom in the Malabar Coast. It was ruled by the Vettathu Raja, who was dependent on the Zamorin of Calicut. The Kshatriya family of the Vettathu Rajas became extinct with the death of the last Raja on 24 May 1793. Vettathunad consisted of the following 21 Amsoms: 

 Pariyapuram
 Rayirimangalam
 Ozhur
 Ponmundam
 Tanalur
 Niramaruthur
 Trikkandiyur
 Iringavoor
 Klari
 Kalpakanchery
 Melmuri
 Ananthavoor
 Kanmanam
 Thalakkad
 Vettom
 Pachattiri
 Mangalam
 Chennara
 Triprangode
 Pallipuram
 Purathur

2. Koottanad

The second home of the Zamorin of Calicut was Thrikkavil Kovilakam at Ponnani in Koottanad. The Zamorin had control over the Koottanad.  It consisted of the following 24 Amsoms:

 Thavanur
 Kalady
 Kodanad
 Melattur
 Chekkod
 Anakkara
 Keezhmuri
 Pothanur
 Eswaramangalam
 Pallaprom
 Ponnani
 Kanjiramukku
 Edappal
 Vattamkulam
 Kumaranellur
 Kothachira
 Nagalassery
 Thirumittacode
 Othalur
 Kappur
 Alamkod
 Pallikkara
 Eramangalam
 Vayilathur

3. Chavakkad

Chavakkad had been under the suzerainty of the Zamorin. It consisted of the following 14 Amsoms:

 Veliyankode
 Ayiroor
 Kadikkad
 Punnayur
 Edakkazhiyur
 Palayoor
 Guruvayur
 Iringaprom
 Annakara
 Brahmakulam
 Mullassery
 Venkitangu
 Chavakkad
 Orumanayur

4. The Island of Chetvai

The Island of Chetvai had been earlier under the suzerainty of the Zamorin, but it came under the possession of the Dutch in 1717. It consisted of the following 7 Amsoms:

 Vadanappally
 Nattika
 Pallipuram
 Edathiruthy
 Kaipamangalam
 Pappinivattom
 Panangad

Palghat Taluk
The Amsoms included in Palghat Taluk was classified into three divisions- Palghat, Temmalapuram, and Naduvattam. There were 56 Amsoms in the Taluk.

1. Palghat

Palghat was ruled by the Palghat Rajas. Sometime previously to 1757, the Zamorin of Calicut, the Kingdom of Valluvanad, and the Kingdom of Cochin had tried to annex Palghat. Cochin had annexed Chittur region. Walluvanad Raja had a nominal sovereignty over the Nairs of Kongad, Edathara, and Mannur. Palghat division consisted of the following 23 Amsoms:

 Cheraya
 Kongad
 Mundur
 Kavilpad
 Akathethara
 Puthussery
 Elappully
 Polpully
 Pallatheri
 Puthur
 Koppam
 Yakkara
 Vadakkanthara
 Kodunthirapalli
 Edathara
 Kizhakkumpuram
 Thadukkassery
 Mathur
 Pallanchathanur
 Kannadi
 Kinassery
 Thiruvalathur
 Palathully

2. Temmalapuram

Temmalapuram consisted of the following 10 Amsoms:

 Chulanur
 Vadakkethara
 Kattusseri
 Kavasseri
 Tarur
 Kannanurpattola
 Ayakkad
 Mangalam
 Vadakkencherry
 Chittilamchery

3. Naduvattam

Naduvattam was originally under the Palghat Raja. Later the Zamorin of Calicut annexed Naduvattam into his kingdom.  It consisted of the following 23 Amsoms:

 Kottayi
 Mankara
 Kuthanur
 Kuzhalmannam
 Vilayanchathanur
 Thenkurissi
 Thannissery
 Peruvemba
 Koduvayur
 Kakkayur
 Vilayannur
 Manjalur
 Erimayur
 Kunissery
 Pallavur
 Kudallur
 Pallassena
 Vadavannur
 Kizhakkethara
 Padinjarethara
 Vattekkad
 Panangattiri
 Muthalamada

Exceptional Nadus (1887)

The Exceptional Nadus included the British colonies which were included in the Malabar District, those were detached from the mainland Taluks of Malabar District by land or sea.

1. Cannanore and Laccadive Islands

These islands were the territory of Arakkal kingdom outside the town of Kannur. They remained in Malabar district until the formation of the state of Kerala in 1956. It consisted of the following 5 inhabited islands of Lakshadweep:

 Agatti
 Kavaratti
 Andrott
 Kalpeni
 Minicoy

The uninhabited island of Bangaram was also a part.

2. Dutch settlements at Cochin (Fort Cochin Taluk)

In 1814, the Dutch settlements at Fort Kochi region of present Kochi city was ceded to East India Company. They were attached to the Malabar District. They remained in the district until the formation of the state of Kerala in 1956. The settlement consisted of the town and fort of Kochi. It was the erstwhile municipality of Fort Kochi. In 1664, the municipality of Fort Kochi was established by Dutch Malabar, making it the first municipality in Indian subcontinent, which got dissolved when the Dutch authority got weaker in the 18th century. It consisted of the following gardens or Pattams:

 Tumboli Pattam
 Kattoor Pattam
 Athazhakkad Pattam
 Manakodathu Pattam
 Antony Fernandez Pattam
 Thekkepurupunkara Pattam
 Mundamveli Pattam
 Domingo Fernandez Palakkal Pattam
 Santiago Pattam
 Thaiveppu Pattam
 Belicho Rodriguez Pattam
 Saint Louis Pattam
 Duart Lemos Pattam
 Hendrick Silva Pattam
 Ramanthuruth Pattam
 Sondikalguvankure Pattam
 Palliport Hospital Parambu

3. The Dutch settlement at Thangacherry and the English Settlement at Anjengo

Those were the British colonies surrounded by the Kingdom of Travancore to three sides and Arabian Sea to one side. Thangassery is actually a part of the city of Kollam. Anchuthengu lies near Attingal in Thiruvananthapuram. Later Thangassery and Anchuthengu were transferred from Malabar to Tirunelveli district on 1 July 1927.

Political and social movements
The district was the venue for many of the Mappila revolts (uprisings against the British East India Company in Kerala) between 1792 and 1921. It is estimated that there were about 830 riots, large and small, during this period. Muttichira revolt, Mannur revolt, Cherur revolt, Manjeri revolt, Wandoor revolt, Kolathur revolt, Ponnani revolt, and Thrikkalur revolt are some important revolts during this period. During 1841-1921 there were more than 86 revolutions against the British officials alone. East India Company made an arrangement to collect revenue through Zamorin. However, a revolt under the leadership of Manjeri Athan Gurukkal took place opposing it in 1849.

The Malabar district political conference of Indian National Congress held at Manjeri on 28 April 1920 strengthened Indian independence movement and national movement in Malabar District. That conference declared that the Montagu–Chelmsford Reforms were not able to satisfy the needs of British India. It also argued for land reform to seek solutions for the problems caused by the tenancy that existed in Malabar. However, the decision widened the drift between extremists and moderates within Congress. The conference resulted in the dissatisfaction of landlords with the Indian National Congress. It caused the leadership of the Malabar district Congress Committee to come under the control of the extremists who stood for labourers and the middle class. Eranad, Valluvanad, and Ponnani Taluks had been part of Khilafat Movement just after the Manjeri conference. The Khilafat non-cooperation demonstration conducted at Kalpakanchery in Ponnani Taluk (now a part of Tirur Taluk) on 22 March 1921 under the leadership of K. P. Kesava Menon was attended by about 20,000 people. The first all Kerala provincial conference of Indian National Congress held at Ottapalam in April 1921 also influenced the rebellion. Malabar Rebellion of 1921 was the last and important among the Mappila rebellions.

The cities/towns of Malappuram, Manjeri, Kondotty, Perinthalmanna, and Tirurangadi were the main strongholds of the rebels. The Battle of Pookkottur occurred as a part of the rebellion. After the army, police, and British authorities fled, the declaration of independence took place in over 200 villages in Eranad, Valluvanad, Ponnani, and Kozhikode taluks. The new country was given the name Malayala Rajyam (The land of Malayalam). On August 25, 1921, Variyan Kunnathu Kunjahammed Haji inaugurated the Military Training Center at Angadipuram, which was started by the revolutionary government. The feudal customs of Kumpil Kanji and Kanabhumi were abolished and the tenants were made landowners. A tax exemption was given for one year and a tax was imposed on the movement of goods from Wayanad to Tamil Nadu. Similar to the British, the structure of administration was built upon Collector, Governor, Viceroy, and King. The parallel government established courts, tax centers, food storage centers, the military, and the legal police. Passport system was introduced for those in the new country. Although the nation's lifespan is less than six months, some British officials have suggested that the region was ruled by a parallel government for more than a year. 

The rebels won to establish self-rule in the region for about six months. However, less than six months after the declaration of autonomy, the East India Company reclaimed the territory and annexed it to the British Raj. The war was directly controlled by British Army Commander-in-Chief Chief Rawlson, General Barnett Stuart, Intelligence Chief Maurice Williams, and Police General Armitage. Many of the important British military regiments including Dorset, Karen, Yenier, Linston, Rajputana, Gorkha, Garwale, and Chin Kutchin reached Malabar for the reannexation of the South Malabar. The Wagon tragedy (1921) is still a saddening memory of the Malabar rebellion, where 64 prisoners died on 20 November 1921. The prisoners had been taken into custody following the Mappila Rebellion in various parts of the district. Their deaths through apparent negligence generated sympathy for Indian independence movement.

Post-Independence
After the Indian independence, Madras Presidency was reorganized into Madras state, which was divided along linguistic lines on 1 November 1956, when Malabar District was merged with erstwhile Kasaragod Taluk immediately to the north and the state of Travancore-Cochin to the south to form the state of Kerala. Malabar District was divided into the three districts of Kozhikode, Palakkad, and Kannur on 1 January 1957. The Chavakkad region of the Ponnani Taluk was transferred to the Thrissur district. Malappuram District was created from parts of Kozhikode and Palakkad in 1969, and Wayanad District was created in 1980 from parts of Kozhikode and Kannur.

Geography

 
Malabar district, also known as the Malayalam district, bears its name from the hilly nature of many areas in the district.  It was one of the two districts of Madras presidency, which lied in the western coast (Malabar coast) of India, the other being the South Canara. The mainland area of Malabar District (excluding Lakshadweep Islands and Fort Kochi region), was surrounded by South Canara (Mangalore) to north, the princely states of Coorg and Mysore to northeast, the British districts of Nilgiris (Ooty) and Coimbatore to southeast, and the princely state of Cochin to south. North Malabar and South Malabar was divided by the river Korapuzha. Wayanad, Valluvanad, and Palakkad Taluks hadn't seacoast, whereas the remaining Taluks in the district had coastal areas.  With an exception of the Lakshadweep islands, the district was wedged between the Lakshadweep Sea and the Western Ghats. Wayanad, which forms a continuation of Mysore Plateau, was the only Plateau in Malabar as well as Kerala. The district was widely scattered and consists of the following parts:- 
Malabar Proper extending north to south along the coast, a distance of around 240 kilometers, and lying between N. Lat 10° 15′ and 12° 18′ N and E.Long. 75° 14′ and 76° 56′.
A group of nineteen isolated bits of territory lying scattered, fifteen of them in the native state of Cochin and the remaining four in those of Travancore, but all of them near the coastline. These isolated bits of territory form the taluk of British Cochin.
Two other detached bits of land, the Tangasseri and the Anchuthengu, within the Travancore.
Four inhabited and ten uninhabited islands of Lakshadweep. The four inhabited islands are: Agatti, Kavaratti, Androth, and Kalpeni.
The solitary island of Minicoy.

The Western Ghats form a continuous mountain range on the eastern border of the district. Only break in the Ghats was formed by the Palakkad Gap. The western part of the district was sandy coast. The Ghats in the district maintained an average elevation of 1500 m, which might occasionally go up to 2500 m. In Kozhikode Taluk, they turned sharply eastwards and after passing the Nilambur valley in Ernad Taluk, they continued further south along the eastern portions of Ernad and Walluvanad Taluks and the northern portion of Palghat Taluk. Palakkad Gap broke the Ghats in Palghat Taluk. The highest peaks in Malabar District was located in Nilambur region on the vicinity of Nilgiri Mountains. The 2,554 m high Mukurthi peak, which is situated in the border of modern-day Nilambur Taluk and  Ooty Taluk, and is also the fifth-highest peak in South India as well as the third-highest in Kerala after Anamudi (2,696 m) and Meesapulimala (2,651 m), was the highest point of elevation in Malabar district. It is also the highest peak in Kerala outside the Idukki district. The 2,383 high Anginda peak, which is located closer to Malappuram-Palakkad-Nilgiris district border is the second-highest peak. Vavul Mala, a 2,339 m high peak situated on the trijunction of Nilambur Taluk of Malappuram, Wayanad, and Thamarassery Taluk of Kozhikode districts, was the third-highest point of elevation in the district. Apart from the main continuous range of Western Ghats, there were many small undulating hills in the lowland of the district. Tropical evergreen forests were present in the mountain ranges in the district. The eastern regions in the modern-day districts of Wayanad, Malappuram (Chaliyar valley at Nilambur), and Palakkad (Attappadi Valley), which together form parts of the Nilgiri Biosphere Reserve and a continuation of the Mysore Plateau, are known for natural Gold fields, along with the adjoining districts of Karnataka.

The largest three rivers in Malabar District were, Bharathappuzha (River Ponnani), Chaliyar, Kadalundippuzha, all of them flowing through South Malabar. Valapattanam River was the largest river in North Malabar region which empties into Arabian Sea near Kannur. Two rivers flowed eastwards in the district - Kabini River in Wynad Taluk and Bhavani River in the high hills of the Walluvanad Taluk. Both of them were tributaries of the River Kaveri. Other rivers in the district were west-flowing which flows into the Arabian Sea. Coastal backwaters like Kavvayi and Biyyam were also there. The important west-flowing rivers included Valapattanam River in Chirakkal Taluk, Anjarakandi River in Kottayam Taluk, Mahé River and Kuttiadi River in Kurumbranad Taluk, Chaliyar in Ernad Taluk, Kadalundi River in Ernad and Walluvanad Taluks, and Bharathappuzha in Ponnani and Palghat Taluks. Other rivers were Kottoor, Irikkur, Vannathi, Pazhayangadi, Perumba, Kuppam, Kuttikol, and Kavvayi in Chirakkal Taluk, Bavali and Iritti in Kottayam Taluk (Bavali flows through Wynad too), Korapuzha in Kurumbranad and Kozhikode Taluks, Panamarampuzha and Manantoddy River in Wynad Taluk, Kallayi, Irittuzhi, Irungi, and Mukkam in Kozhikode Taluk, Thuthapuzha in Ponnani and Walluvanad Taluks, Olipuzha and Siruvani in Walluvanad Taluk, and Kalpathipuzha, Yakkarapuzha, and Gayathripuzha in Palghat Taluk.

Administrative divisions 

Malabar district had 5 revenue divisions namely, Thalassery (Tellicherry), Kozhikode (Calicut), Malappuram, Palakkad (Palghat), and Fort Cochin and 10 Taluks within them. The plateau of Wayanad was a separate Revenue Division until 1924. Later it was merged with Thalassery.

Thalassery Revenue Division 
Headquartered at Thalassery

Taluks
 Chirakkal (Area:; Headquarters:Chirakkal), now Kannur
 Kottayam (Area:; Headquarters:Kottayam), now Thalassery
 Wayanad (Area:; Headquarters:Mananthavady)

Kozhikode Revenue Division 
Headquartered at Kozhikode

Taluks
 Kurumbranad (Area:; Headquarters:),now Vatakara
 Kozhikode & Laccadive Islands (Area:; Headquarters:Kozhikode) 
(Laccadive islands were a separate Taluk under British rule. Later it merged with Kozhikode Taluk.)

Malappuram Revenue Division 
Headquartered at Malappuram

Taluks
 Ernad (Area:; Headquarters:Manjeri)
 Valluvanad (Area:; Headquarters:), now Perinthalmanna

Palakkad Revenue Division 
Headquartered at Palakkad

Taluks
 Ponnani (Area:; Headquarters:Ponnani)
 Palakkad (Area:; Headquarters:Palakkad)

Fort Cochin Revenue Division 
Headquartered at Fort Cochin
 Cochin (Area:; Headquarters:Cochin)

Demography
Native castes in the erstwhile Malabar District include Nambudiri Brahmin, Nair, Thiyya, Mappila, and Scheduled Castes and Tribes.

Among various Hindu castes, Thiyyas were the most populous in the erstwhile Malabar District according to 1881 Census of India. Thiyyas formed nearly 35% of the total Hindus of Malabar in 1881. Mannanar was a former Thiyyar dynasty in Malabar. Kalari Panicker, Chekavar, etc. were some subdivisions of Thiyya caste. They were present in large numbers in almost all Taluks of Malabar except Palghat, Cochin, and Laccadive Islands. Thiyyas were similar to Billavas of Tulu Nadu. In Palghat Taluk, there were Ezhavas instead of Thiyyas.

Nairs were the second-largest caste accounting for nearly 20% of the Hindu population in 1881. Their presence was scattered all over Malabar except Laccadive and Minicoy Islands. According to William Logan, the main subdivisions among the Nair of erstwhile Malabar District were Menon, Nayanar (in North Malabar), Menoky, Moopil Nair, Pada Nair, Kuruppu, Kaimal, Panikkar, Kiryathil Nair, Moothar, Oore, Kidavu, Kartha, Eradi (in Eranad and Kozhikode), Vellodi (in Valluvanad), Nedungadi (in Nedunganad), Mannadiyar (in Palakkad), and Manavalan. Nairs were similar to the Bunts of Tulu Nadu.

Malabar Manual states that the royal family of Parappanad belonged to Kshatriya caste, from where members for Travancore royal family were usually selected. The rulers of the Kingdom of Kottayam (Thalassery) also belonged to Kshatriyas. Ambalavasi population was higher in South Malabar, compared to that in North Malabar.

Nambudiri Brahmins, who had the highest position in caste system, were mainly concentrated around the river Bharathappuzha, mainly in the Taluks of Valluvanad and Ponnani, in South Malabar. According to 1881 Census, more than 50% of all Nambudiris in Malabar were settled in Valluvanad and Ponnani taluks. Nearly 90% of the Nambudiris of Malabar were from South Malabar, while North Malabar contributed only around 10%. Kozhikode and Eranad came next to Valluvanad and Ponnani in Namboodiri population. Azhvanchery Thamprakkal, who were the head of all Namboodiri of Kerala belong to Athavanad in erstwhile Ponnani taluk. There were some Iyer Brahmins in Palghat Taluk and Tuluva Brahmins in North Malabar.

Cherumar/Cheramar population was comparatively higher in the erstwhile Taluk of Cheranad (merged with Eranad and Ponnani in the 1860s)  and its surroundings.  Nearly 70% of all Cherumars of Malabar District in 1857 census were from the Taluks of Eranad, Valluvanad, Ponnani, and Palakkad. William Logan notes in his Malabar Manual that a larger number of Cherumar caste converted into Islam in the Taluks of Eranad, Ponnani, and Valluvanad during 1871–1881, comparing the census reports of 1871 and 1881.

Muslim population was higher in South Malabar compared to its northern counterparts. Muslims formed nearly 100% of population in Laccadive Islands, and more than 50% in Eranad Taluk, according to 1881 Census. Muslim population was much higher than the district average in the Taluks of Valluvanad and Ponnani too in 1881. At the same time Palakkad Taluk had the least population of Muslims in 1881. Their population was higher in former territories of the Zamorin of Calicut. Mappila Muslims of Malabar were similar to the Beary Muslims of Tulu Nadu.

Fort Cochin Taluk had the highest Christian population in Malabar while Valluvanad Taluk and Laccadive Islands had the least.  The presence of Saint Thomas Christians was significant only in the southern portions of Ponnani taluk (Chavakkad region) and Fort Kochi.

The Talukwise area and population of Malabar district as of 1951 Census of India are given below:

Towns and Types
Although there were several settlements across Malabar district during the Madras Presidency or Pre-Independence era, only a handful were officially considered as 'Towns'. Those were Cannanore, Tellicherry, Badagara, Calicut, Malappuram, Tanur, Ponnani, Palghat and Fort Kochi. The municipalities of Kozhikode, Palakkad, Fort Kochi, Kannur, and Thalassery, were formed on 1 November 1866 according to the Madras Act 10 of 1865 (Amendment of the Improvements in Towns act 1850) of the British Indian Empire, making all of them the first modern municipalities in Kerala. Even the Thiruvananthapuram municipality was formed in 1920 (54 years later).

Abbreviations

1951 Census of India
The settlements with a population of more than 50,000 were considered as cities and those had between 10,000 and 50,000 were considered as towns. The following table gives the cities and towns of Malabar district classified by their population as of the 1951 Census:

Local bodies
At the time of 1951 Census of India, Malabar District was divided into 5 Municipalities and 100 Panchayat Boards. Among them 2 municipalities (Kozhikode and Palakkad) were treated as cities. The municipalities were Kozhikode, Palakkad, Kannur, Thalassery, and Fort Cochin. The other towns mentioned above, i.e., Shoranur, Ottapalam, Manjeri, Ponnani, Tanur, Trikkandiyur (Tirur), Feroke, Pandalayini (Quilandy), and Badagara, were treated as Panchayat towns. The Taluk-wise details of 5 Municipalities and 100 Panchayat Boards under Malabar District Board at that time are given below:

Politics

Representatives from Malabar to Madras State
In C. Rajagopalachari Ministry: 1) Kongattil Raman Menon (1937–39), 2) C. J. Varkey, Chunkath (1939)
In Prakasam Ministry: 1) R. Raghavamenon (1946–47)
In Ramaswami Reddyar Ministry: 1) Kozhippurathu Madhavamenon (1947–49)
In P. S. Kumaraswami Ministry: 1) Kozhippurathu Madhavamenon (1949–52)
In C. Rajagopalachari Ministry: 1) K. P. Kuttikrishnan Nair (1952–54) Kalladi Unnikammu Sahib

1951–52 Indian general election
In the first election to the Lok Sabha conducted under the provisions of the Indian Constitution after Independence, Malabar district had five constituencies, Kannur, Thalassery, Kozhikode, Malappuram and Ponnani.

1952 Madras Legislative Assembly election
25 State Legislative Assembly constituencies were allotted from the Malabar District to the First Assembly of Madras State. 4 of them were dual-member constituencies. The total number of seats in the district was 29 (including dual member constituencies).

Malabar Cuisine

The Malabar cuisine depicts it culture and heritage. It is famous for Malabar biriyani. The city of Kozhikode is also famous for Haluva called as Sweet Meat by Europeans due to the texture of the sweet. Kozhikode has a main road in the town named Mittai Theruvu (Sweet Meat Street, or S.M. Street for short). It derived this name from the numerous Halwa stores which used to dot the street.

Another speciality is banana chips, which are made crisp and wafer-thin. Other popular dishes include seafood preparations (prawns, mussels, mackerel) . Vegetarian fare includes the sadya.

Malabar cuisine is a blend of traditional Kerala, Persian, Yemenese and Arab food culture. This confluence of culinary cultures is best seen in the preparation of most dishes. Kallummakkaya (mussels) curry, irachi puttu (irachi meaning meat), parottas (soft flatbread), Pathiri (a type of rice pancake) and ghee rice are some of the other specialties. The characteristic use of spices is the hallmark of Malabar cuisine—black pepper, cardamom and clove are used profusely.

The Malabar version of biryani, popularly known as kuzhi mandi in Malayalam is another popular item, which has an influence from Yemen. Various varieties of biriyanis like Thalassery biriyani, Kannur biriyani, Kozhikode biriyani and Ponnani biriyani are prepared in Malabar.
 	
The snacks include unnakkaya (deep-fried, boiled ripe banana paste covering a mixture of cashew, raisins and sugar), pazham nirachathu (ripe banana filled with coconut grating, molasses or sugar), muttamala made of eggs, chatti pathiri, a dessert made of flour, like a baked, layered chapati with rich filling, arikkadukka, and more.

However, the newer generation is more inclined towards to Chinese and American food. Chinese food is very popular among the locals.

Notable people from Malabar
 List of people from North Malabar
 List of people from South Malabar

Modern day taluks and islands in erstwhile Malabar

Historical maps

See also

Zamorin
Arakkal kingdom
Kingdom of Mysore
Dutch Malabar
Treaty of Seringapatam
Pazhassi Raja
William Logan (author)
North Malabar
South Malabar
Malabar pepper
Kerala
Lakshadweep
Kozhikode district
Wayanad district
Nilgiris district
Kannur district
Kasaragod district
Malappuram district
Palakkad district
Thrissur district
Fort Kochi
Kolathunadu
Kingdom of Valluvanad
Kingdom of Tanur
Travancore
Kingdom of Cochin
Travancore-Cochin
States Reorganisation Act, 1956

References

Further reading 
  (The English translation of Tuhfat Ul Mujahideen)
 
 
 
 
 
 
 
 
 
 
 

Historical Indian regions
Regions of Kerala
Districts of the Madras Presidency
History of Kerala
1792 establishments in India